Li Biao (born 12 December 1997) is a Chinese footballer currently playing as a midfielder for Hubei Istar.

Career statistics

Club
.

Notes

References

1997 births
Living people
Footballers from Yunnan
Chinese footballers
Association football midfielders
Shaoxing Keqiao Yuejia F.C. players
Gondomar S.C. players
F.C. Maia players
Chinese expatriate footballers
Chinese expatriate sportspeople in Portugal
Expatriate footballers in Portugal